Thank You (For Letting Us Be Ourselves) is the third full-length album by Swedish hard rock band Hardcore Superstar, released by the Music for Nations record label.

Track listing 
 "That's My Life" – 3:12
 "Not Dancing, Wanna Know Why?" – 3:02
 "Shame" – 4:23
 "Just Another Score" – 3:33
 "Summer Season's Gone" – 4:10
 "Wimpy Sister" – 3:29
 "Do Me That Favour" – 3:29
 "Significant Other" – 3:34
 "Dear Old Fame" – 4:58
 "Smoke 'Em" – 4:16
 "Riding With The King" – 4:18
 "They Are Not Even A New Bang Tango" – 2:35
 "Mother's Love" – 5:49
 "A Long Way To Go" (Japanese bonus track) – 3:02
 "Things On Fire" (Japanese bonus track) – 3:18
 "Staden Göteborg (feat. LOK)" – 2:54

2001 albums
Hardcore Superstar albums